Gray Peak is the seventh-highest peak in the High Peaks Region of the Adirondack Park, in New York, United States, and is located in close proximity to Mount Marcy, the highest peak in New York state. Gray Peak is southwest of Mt. Marcy and southeast of Mount Colden. 
It was named for Asa Gray by Verplanck Colvin.

Gray Peak is most frequently climbed from Lake Tear of the Clouds, with approaches via Elk Lake or Upper Works.  Gray is the highest peak in the Adirondacks without a maintained and marked trail.  This fact, combined with the somewhat limited view from Gray's summit, means that it is less frequently climbed than many shorter peaks.

References

External links
 

Mountains of Essex County, New York
Adirondack High Peaks
Mountains of New York (state)